The Animals of Farthing Wood is a series of books about a group of woodland animals by Colin Dann.

The Animals of Farthing Wood may also refer to:

The Animals of Farthing Wood (TV series), 1992–1995 British children's animated series based on the novel
The Animals of Farthing Wood (book), the first book of the Animals of Farthing Wood book series